Sharon Grove is an unincorporated community located in Todd County, Kentucky, United States. It was also known as Frog Level.

Geography 
Sharon Grove is located in the northeastern portion of Todd County just west of its border with Logan County.

Education
Students in the community attend the institutions of the Todd County Schools system. North Todd Elementary near Allegre is the closest institution to the area; it is a feeder to Todd County Central Middle and High Schools in Elkton.

Post office
Prior to 1996, Sharon Grove had a locally-operated post office using ZIP code 42280.

References

Unincorporated communities in Todd County, Kentucky
Unincorporated communities in Kentucky